The 2015–16 Maritime Junior Hockey League season was the 49th season in league history. Each team played 48 games.

At the end of the regular season, the league's top teams competed for the Kent Cup, the league's playoff championship trophy. The team successful in winning the Kent Cup had a chance to compete for the 2016 Fred Page Cup to determine the Eastern Canadian Champion, if successful in winning the team moved on to compete for the 2016 Royal Bank Cup to determine the 2016 Junior 'A' champion.

Team Changes

No team changes.

Regular Season Standings 
Note: GP = Games played; W = Wins; L = Losses; OTL = Overtime losses; SL = Shootout losses; GF = Goals for; GA = Goals against; PTS = Points; STK = Streak; x = Clinched playoff spot y = Clinched division; z = Clinched first overall

Final Standings

2016 MHL Playoff bracket

Quarter-finals

 *= If Necessary

South Division Semi-final 1 (1) Truro Beatcats vs. (4) South Shore Lumberjacks

South Division Semi-final 2 (2) Valley Wildcats vs. (3) Pictou County Crushers

North Division Semi-final 1 (1) Summerside Western Capitals vs. (4) Campbellton Tigers

North Division Semi-final 2 (2) Woodstock Slammers vs. (3) Dieppe Commandos

Semi-finals

South Division Finals (3) Pictou County Crushers vs (4) Shouth Shore Lumberjacks

North Division Finals (1) Summerside Western Capitals vs (3) Dieppe Commandos

Kent Cup Finals

Kent Cup Finals (3) Dieppe Commandos vs (3) Pictou County Crushers

External links 
 Official website of the Maritime Junior Hockey League
 Official website of the Canadian Junior Hockey League

MHL
Maritime Junior Hockey League seasons